Antal Tapiška (11 November 1919 – 10 March 2016) was a Yugoslav football player and manager.

Club career
He started his playing career while serving the mandatory military conscription and affiliated in the Yugoslav Navy side Mornar Split, later moving to Yugoslav Air Force side FK Naša Krila Zemun. His talent took him to join the main army backed team, FK Partizan, in 1946. Partizan was newly formed club which gathered most of the best players of the country, so Tapiška found himself in difficulties to establish himself, despite all, he managed to make with Partizan one appearance in the 1946–47 Yugoslav First League, 4 appearances in the Yugoslav Cup, and 29 in friendlies and tournaments.

Not wanting to stay as a substitute, Tapiška decided to leave Partizan and joined FK Spartak Subotica where he spent the next 14 years. He became a legendary defender shirt number 2 who became fundamental in all achievements of Spartak between 1947 until 1960. He played over 500 official games in that period of time. Tapiška retired in 1960 and in his honor Spartak organised a farewell match against Dynamo Dresden.

Coaching career
After finishing his playing career, he became a manager, and coached minor local teams such as Vonogradar and Zorka. He also coached the woman's section of Spartak Subotica and also the youth teams of the club. Afterwards, he became member of the direction board of management of the Subotica City Stadium.

References

1919 births
2016 deaths
Sportspeople from Subotica
Hungarians in Vojvodina
Yugoslav footballers
Serbian footballers
Hungarian footballers
Association football defenders
FK Naša Krila Zemun players
FK Partizan players
FK Spartak Subotica players
Red Star Belgrade footballers
Yugoslav First League players
Yugoslav football managers
Serbian football managers